Zhapokikë is a village in the former municipality of Tërpan in Berat County, Albania. At the 2015 local government reform it became part of the municipality Poliçan.

References

Populated places in Poliçan
Villages in Berat County